Márcio Pereira da Silva or simply Márcio (born June 10, 1984 in Natal), is a Brazilian attacking midfielder. He currently plays for ABC.

Made professional debut with Atlético-PR in 3-3 draw away to Londrina in the Campeonato Paranaense on February 1, 2007.

Contract
18 August 2005 to 30 December 2008

External links
 CBF
 sambafoot
 rubronegro.net
 furacao.com

1984 births
Living people
People from Natal, Rio Grande do Norte
Brazilian footballers
Club Athletico Paranaense players
ABC Futebol Clube players
Association football midfielders
Sportspeople from Rio Grande do Norte